Nkandla flavisecta is a species of moth of the family Tortricidae. It is found in South Africa, where it has been recorded from KwaZulu-Natal at altitudes of about 1,100 meters.

The length of the forewings is 4-4.5 mm. The ground colour of the forewings is gold, divided by a distinct
brownish and leaden-grey basal patch, a median fascia, and a weak subterminal fascia. Adults have been recorded on wing in January and March.

References

	

Endemic moths of South Africa
Moths described in 1918
Archipini